San Antonio de Ureca, also known as Ureka or Ureca is a village in Bioko Sur, Equatorial Guinea, south of Malabo on the island of Bioko.
The town of Ureka is included among the wettest areas in the world; it receives about 10,450 millimeters (418 ins) of rainfall annually. It is the wettest place in Africa.

References

Bioko
Populated places in Bioko Sur
Populated coastal places in Equatorial Guinea
Weather extremes of Earth